The Ford 4.4 TD is a diesel V8 engine developed and built by Ford Motor Company. As with the other AJDs, it has a Compacted Graphite Iron block that reduces weight while increasing engine block strength.

The  is built at Chihuahua Engine Plant in Chihuahua City, Mexico along with the 6.7L Ford Power Stroke Diesel engine available in Ford Super Duty trucks. Current application of the  TD engine is the Land Rover Range Rover.

While in development, the 4.4 TD was rumored to be for use in the Ford F-150, Ford Expedition, and as an entry level diesel option for the Super Duty. No such option ever became available with Ford citing the reason as being a low demand for a vehicle with a $6000–$8000 premium over its gasoline models.

See also
 Ford AJD-V6/PSA DT17#Lion V8, Ford Lion V8
 List of Ford engines

Sources
 
 

4.4L
Diesel engines by model
V8 engines